This list contains all cultural property of national significance (class A) in the canton of Uri from the 2009 Swiss Inventory of Cultural Property of National and Regional Significance. It is sorted by municipality and contains 41 individual buildings, 3 collections and 2 archaeological finds.

The geographic coordinates provided are in the Swiss coordinate system as given in the Inventory.

Altdorf

Andermatt

Attinghausen

Bauen

Bürglen

Erstfeld

Flüelen

Göschenen

Gurtnellen

Hospental

Isenthal

Schattdorf

Seedorf

Seelisberg

Silenen

Sisikon

Spiringen

Unterschächen

Wassen

References
 All entries, addresses and coordinates are from:

External links
 Swiss Inventory of Cultural Property of National and Regional Significance, 2009 edition:

PDF documents: Class B objects
Geographic information system